Year 385 (CCCLXXXV) was a common year starting on Wednesday (link will display the full calendar) of the Julian calendar. At the time, it was known as the Year of the Consulship of Augustus and Bauto (or, less frequently, year 1138 Ab urbe condita). The denomination 385 for this year has been used since the early medieval period, when the Anno Domini calendar era became the prevalent method in Europe for naming years.

Events

By place

Roman Empire 
 The Roman synod exiles the prophet Jerome, who has incorporated ideas first propounded by the Roman statesman Cicero. He departs for Egypt, Bethlehem, and Jerusalem, accompanied by the Christian ascetic Paula, who will edit Jerome's translation of the Bible, which becomes the Latin Vulgate.

Asia 
 Jinsa of Baekje becomes the 16th king of the ancient Korean kingdom of Baekje.

By topic

Arts and Sciences 
 Ammianus Marcellinus begins writing a history, in the style of Tacitus, covering the years AD 96–378.

Religion 
 The Serapeum of Alexandria, one of the largest Greek temples in Egypt, is destroyed by a Christian mob. The precise date is disputed, with 391 sometimes given as the moment of final destruction.
 Theophilus becomes Patriarch of Alexandria.
 Pope Siricius issues the Directa Decretal, proclaiming the primacy of Rome and the priestly obligation of celibacy.
 Priscillian, Spanish bishop, is accused of Manichaeism and magic, and beheaded at Trier . He becomes the first person in the history of Christianity to be executed for heresy.

Sport in the Roman Empire 
 Aurelios Zopyros becomes the last reported athlete at the Ancient Olympic Games. He is a victor in "junior boxing" (pankration).

Births 
 Avitus, Western Roman Emperor (approximate date)
 Murong Chao, emperor of the Xianbei state Southern Yan (d. 410)
 Murong Xi, emperor of the Xianbei state Later Yan (d. 407)
 Pulcheria, daughter of Theodosius I who died in infancy (d. 386)
 Saint Patrick, missionary in Ireland (approximate date)
 Paulus Orosius, historian and theologian (approximate date)
 Xie Lingyun, Chinese poet of the Southern and Northern Dynasties (d. 433)

Deaths 
 October 16 – Fú Jiān, emperor of the Chinese Di state Former Qin (b. 337)
 Aelia Flaccilla, Roman empress and wife of Theodosius I (or possibly 386)
 Chimnyu, king of Baekje (Korea)
 Dao An, Buddhist monk of the Jin Dynasty (b. 312)
 Murong Wei, emperor of the Xianbei state Former Yan (b. 350)
 Priscillian, Spanish bishop and theologian
 Xie An, statesman of the Jin Dynasty (b. 320)

References